Hannah Quinlivan (born 12 August 1993), also known as Jen Wu and stage name Kun Ling, is a Taiwanese Australian actress and model.

Life and career 
Hannah Quinlivan was born in Taipei, Taiwan and raised in New South Wales, Australia. Her father is Australian, and her mother is Chinese-Korean. Quinlivan graduated from Benowa State High School.

Quinlivan began her career by appearing in Blackie's Teenage Club in 2008. She became a guest host of I Love The Man in December 2011.

She made her acting debut in Ti Amo Chocolate in 2012, playing Peng Kaili.

Quinlivan's first film role was an uncredited appearance in the film Step Back to Glory (2013). That same year, she had a minor role as Lin Jiayi in Amour et Pâtisserie.

In 2014, she appeared in Moon River, playing Lucy. She made a cameo appearance in the television series The Lying Game. She was cast in the lead role of Ren Yuhong in Heart Of Steel. She was cast in the film Twa-Tiu-Tiann, playing the former girlfriend of Chris Wang's character. 

In 2017, just three days after she gave birth to her second child, Quinlivan auditioned for her role in the action thriller film Skyscraper, which was released in 2018.

She also played a role in film Skyfire (2019) as Li Xiaomeng, and acted as a top cast in the film Nezha (2021) as Lili Lu.

Personal life 
In November 2014, Quinlivan confirmed her relationship with singer and actor Jay Chou. In December 2014, Chou announced that he would marry Quinlivan on his 36th birthday.
Quinlivan holds dual Taiwanese and Australian citizenship.

Sarah Haywood planned their wedding in England. It took place in Selby Abbey, North Yorkshire on 17 January 2015, one day before Chou's birthday. A private wedding ceremony open to friends and family occurred on 9 February in Taipei. A third reception, this time in Australia, was held in March. According to Chou's official Facebook page, the couple has been registered for marriage since July 2014. The couple have three children: daughter Hathaway (born July 2015), son Romeo (born June 2017). and daughter Jacinda (born May 2022).

Filmography

Television series

Film

Music video

References

External links 

 
 
 
 

1993 births
Living people
Actresses from Taipei
Taiwanese female models
21st-century Taiwanese actresses
New York Film Academy alumni
Taiwanese people of Australian descent
Taiwanese people of Korean descent
Taiwanese film actresses
Taiwanese television actresses
Taiwanese Christians